Stranded is a 3D action-adventure video game, developed by Unreal Software. The main goal of the Robinsonade game is to survive on a dangerous island and to find a way to return home.

The game is free to download and play. The second installment of the game was released under the CC BY-NC-SA Creative Commons license with its source code.

History
Stranded was released in mid-2003 by Peter Schauß, the founder of Unreal Software. Its design and gameplay are influenced by the relatively unknown German freeware game Schiffbruch.

Stranded was a success in November 2003, appearing in four different German gaming magazines and the Rhein-Zeitung. After release of Version 1.3 development ceased, and the Stranded source code was released, but without any license information given, thus leaving all copyrights still on Peter Schauß.

Gameplay
The game has no campaign mode, but its "random island" mode is wrapped up in a story where the player is stranded on a deserted island. Resource management is a vital component of gameplay, since the player character has a constant need for food and water, and has to sleep. The game features a day and night cycle. Sleeping in the open injures the player, unprocessed food is not very effective against hunger and aggressive animals threaten the player. So the player is forced to gather resources like branches, stones and vines to construct tools, buildings and weapons. Each building that is finished will unlock another, more sophisticated building, until the player is able to build a raft to escape from the island and reach his homeland.

The terrain in the game is completely modifiable.

There are also some mini-missions such as rescuing kiwi birds or fighting off a pack of blood-thirsty raptors under a time limit. Such custom maps can be created with the built-in map editor. Several of these fan-made maps can be downloaded from the Stranded home page. Although there are some limited settings, such as turning off the need for food, water and sleep, any way of story-telling is limited to a single briefing message after the map has started and creative terrain design.

Stranded II

Peter Schauß started work on the sequel Stranded II in late 2003. Development entered public alpha stage in December 2005. But still, the release of the final version didn't happen until June 2007. Stranded II had improved visuals and much more features than its predecessor, and was built with ease of modding in mind.

Stranded 3
As of 2012, Peter Schauß has started working on another sequel, Stranded III. There will be multiplayer support which will be a part of the Unreal Software Gaming Network (U.S.G.N.) which is already being used for Counter Strike 2D and Carnage Contest. There is no mobile version planned but there are possibilities that once the PC version is launched mobile development will take place.

References

External links
 Developer Unreal Software official website
 Official Stranded home page

2003 video games
Action-adventure games
Freeware games
Video games set on islands
Windows games
Windows-only games
Windows-only freeware games
Survival video games
Video games developed in Germany
Video games with available source code